The 2004 FIBA Europe Under-20 Championship was the seventh edition of the FIBA Europe Under-20 Championship. The city of Brno, in the Czech Republic, hosted the tournament. Slovenia won their second title.

Teams

Squads

Qualification

Twenty-five national teams entered the qualifying round. They were allocated in five groups. The first two teams from groups A, B, C, D and the first three teams from group E qualified for the tournament, where they joined Czech Republic (qualified as hosts).

Group A

|}

Group B

|}

Group C

|}

Group D

|}

Group E

|}

Preliminary round
The twelve teams were allocated in two groups of six teams each.

Group A

Group B

Knockout stage

9th–12th playoffs

Championship

5th–8th playoffs

Final standings

Stats leaders

Points

Rebounds

Assists

All-Tournament Team
  Yotam Halperin
  Ivan Koljević
  Kostas Vasileiadis
  Linas Kleiza
  Erazem Lorbek (MVP)

References

FIBA Archive
FIBA Europe Archive

2004–05 in European basketball
2004–05 in Czech basketball
FIBA U20 European Championship
Sport in Brno
International youth basketball competitions hosted by the Czech Republic